Reminiscence of a Novelist (Hangul: 가을인 듯 추억; 어느 소설가 이야기) was the third solo concert by Super Junior's Kyuhyun.

Summary  
SM Entertainment announced Kyuhyun third solo concert on November 23, 2016, on their official website. Commenced in Seoul continued to Busan. The Seoul ticket concert available on September 29, while the Busan concert on October 6, on YES24

Tour dates

Personnel 
 Artist: Kyuhyun
 Organizer Tour: SM Entertainment
 Promotor Tour: Dream Maker Entertainment

References

External links 
  / Kyuhyun official Website 

2016 concert tours
Cho Kyuhyun concert tours